CitizenGO is an ultra-conservative advocacy group founded in Madrid, Spain, in 2013 by the ultra-Catholic and far-right HazteOir organization.

The foundation aims to be "a community of active citizens that seeks to promote the participation of society in politics" and "defend and promote life, family, and liberty." It promotes petitions in 50 countries, mostly defending Christian causes, and those opposing same-sex marriage, abortion, and euthanasia.

History 
CitizenGO was founded in Madrid, Spain, in September 2013 by HazteOir to expand its scope of action beyond Spanish-speaking countries, advancing the use of online petitions as a form of Internet activism to increase public participation in the democratic process. In appealing to potential donors early into CitizenGO's existence, the founder and president Ignacio Arsuaga stated: "CitizenGO will produce a social benefit that we trust will impact human history. Abortionists, the homosexual lobby, radical secularists, and champions of relativism will find themselves behind CitizenGO’s containment wall".

CitizenGO says that they have "team members located in fifteen cities on three continents" who facilitate users signing petitions in 50 countries and 8 languages, with plans to add more. The CitizenGO Foundation is financially supported by online donations made by their members. The CEO of CitizenGO is Álvaro Zulueta. The CitizenGO Foundation Board of Trustees is composed of Ignacio Arsuaga, Walter Hintz, Blanca Escobar, Luca Volontè (Unione dei Democratici Cristiani politician), Brian S. Brown (president of the anti-LGBT rights National Organization for Marriage), Gualberto García, Alexey Komov (Russian Representative of the pro-Christian right World Congress of Families, considered a close ally of pro-Vladimir Putin oligarch Konstantin Malofeev), Alejandro Bermudez, and John-Henry Westen.

In 2001, lawyer Ignacio Arsuaga founded HazteOir (literally, "Make yourself heard"). This organization later merged into and became part of CitizenGO, a move that was considered a "rebranding".

The foundation has been linked, like HazteOir, to El Yunque, a secret society of Mexican regional origin.

In 2021, CitizenGO board member Luca Volontè was sentenced to four years in prison for accepting bribes from Azerbaijan during the Azerbaijani laundromat in exchange for suppressing a report on Azerbaijan's human rights record. Some of these laundered funds were transferred to CitizenGO.

Activities

Abortion and euthanasia 
CitizenGO promotes campaigns opposing abortion and euthanasia. CitizenGO has opposed the introduction of the "Estrela report" into the European parliament, which recommends member states to provide comprehensive sex education in schools and ensure access to abortions, among other things.

In late May 2019, CitizenGO hosted a petition by "Right to Life" calling on streaming service Netflix to stop funding a legal challenge to Georgia's controversial heartbeat abortion restriction bill. The group also called for subscribers to cancel their Netflix subscription as a sign of protest.

It has also supported African activist Ann Kioko's campaign to investigate pro-abortion rights group Marie Stopes International. After Kioko was put on trial CitizenGO utilized their platform to promote the idea that the Kenyan government wants to censor the protests of CitizenGO and other anti-abortion outlets.

Defense of the Russian gay propaganda law 
In 2013, CitizenGO signed a declaration in support of the Russian law, which had the stated purpose of protecting children from being exposed to homosexuality.

Second Coming comic series 
In February 2019, CitizenGO organized a petition calling on DC Vertigo to cancel Mark Russell and Richard Pace's Second Coming comic series, which they regarded as blasphemous for its depiction of Jesus Christ. Russell subsequently confirm that it had been his decision to request the return of the rights to the series.

2019 Disneyland "Magical Parade" 
In late May 2018, CitizenGO circulated a petition calling on Disneyland Paris to cancel a scheduled pride parade called the "Magical Parade" on 1 June 2019. The Walt Disney Company rejected the petition and the Magical Parade went ahead in Paris.

LGBT rights and reproductive health misinformation campaign in Kenya 
CitizenGO Africa opposes decriminalising homosexuality in Kenya. According to a 2021 investigation by Mozilla Foundation, it also engaged in spreading misinformation concerning reproductive health policy in the country through a tweets and hashtags on Twitter as well as paying Kenyans to also tweet against debated legislation, which aimed to develop guidelines for surrogacy as well as improving reproductive health care and rights.

Paradise PD TV series 
CitizenGO started a campaign to have the episode "Trigger Warning" from the TV series Paradise PD removed from Netflix. This is because of a depiction of Jesus Christ, in which he is seen attacking his persecutors with machine guns and having sex with two women.

See also 
 Online petition
 Internet activism

References

External links 
 

Lobbying organizations in the United States
Same-sex marriage in the United States
Online organizations
Christian organisations based in Spain
Conservatism in Spain